Mount Adams most often refers to:
 Mount Adams (Washington) (3,743 m), a volcano in the Cascades and second highest mountain in the Washington state

Other mountains
 Mount Adams (New Hampshire) (1,760 m) in the White Mountains near Mount Washington, second highest in New England
 Mount Adams (Colorado) (4,248 m) in the Rocky Mountains near the Crestones

 Mount Adams (Montana) (2,344 m), a mountain in Flathead County, Montana
 Mount Adams (New York) (1,073 m)
 Mount Adams (New Zealand) (2,208 m)
 Mount Adams (Western Australia) (258 m)
 Chief peak of Adams Mountains, Antarctica

Other uses
 Mount Adams, Cincinnati, a neighborhood in the Ohio city, centered on the eponymous hill
 Mount Adams (Bel Air, Maryland), a house on the National Register of Historic Places

See also
 Mount Quincy Adams (disambiguation)
 Mount Adam (disambiguation)